Dallëndyshe ("The Swallow") is the fifth studio album by Swiss-Albanian jazz musician Elina Duni and the second under ECM Records. It was released in April 2015.

Composition
Like her previous album, the troubled past of the Balkan region is the main inspiration for the album, but Elina Duni adds that "Even though we are dealing with tragic themes of exile it is not as dark as Matanё Malit."

Track listing
ECM – ECM 2401.

Personnel
Elina Duni – voice
Colin Vallon – piano
Patrice Moret – double bass
Norbert Pfammatter – drums

References

ECM Records albums
2015 albums
Albums produced by Manfred Eicher